Muhammad Danial Ashraf bin Abdullah (born 8 January 1997) is a Malaysian professional footballer who plays as an attacking midfielder for Malaysia Super League club Kelantan.

Club career

Early career
Danial began his career with the Kelantan U19 in 2014. He was included in the team that won the 2014 Malaysia Youth League, he making a goal in the final against PDRM U19. In 2015, he was loaned to Harimau Muda C before the program was cancelled later he returned to Kelantan. He was promoted to Kelantan FA U21 in 2016 that won the 2016 Malaysia President's Cup, he scoring a goal in the final against T-Team U21 -- the top goalscorer (19) in the competition.

Kelantan FA
After showing good performances with the youth team, he was selected into the Malaysia national football team for the 2016 Malaysia Cup, selected in the team for the 2017 Malaysia Super League. On 18 February 2017, he made his league debut appearance against Kedah coming on as a substitute for Alessandro Celin in the 12th minute, in a 0–1 loss.

Career statistics

Club

Honours

Club
Kelantan U19
 Youth League: 2014

Kelantan U21
 President Cup: 2016

References

External links

Living people
1997 births
People from Kelantan
Malaysian people of Malay descent
Malaysian footballers
Association football midfielders
Kelantan F.C. players
Penang F.C. players
Malaysia international footballers
Malaysia Super League players
Malaysia youth international footballers